Erica haematocodon, the blood-bell heath, is a species of Erica that was naturally restricted to the city of Cape Town, South Africa, where it grows in the Peninsula Sandstone Fynbos of Table Mountain.

References

haematocodon
Endemic flora of South Africa
Flora of the Cape Provinces
Natural history of Cape Town